Minton Township is an inactive township in Holt County, in the U.S. state of Missouri.

Minton Township was erected in 1868, and named after a pioneer citizen.

References

Townships in Missouri
Townships in Holt County, Missouri